The Blue Water (previously the Blue Water Limited) is a higher-speed passenger train service operated by Amtrak as part of its Michigan Services.  The  route runs from Chicago, Illinois, to Port Huron in Michigan's Blue Water Area, for which the train is named. Major stops are in Kalamazoo, Battle Creek, East Lansing, and Flint.

Amtrak began running the Blue Water in 1974 over the Grand Trunk Western Railroad. In 1982 the train was extended from Port Huron to Toronto, Canada, and renamed the International Limited. Service was cut back to the original route in 2004 with the Blue Water name restored.

History

The Lansing area, home of the Michigan state capitol and Michigan State University, was left out of Amtrak's original system. Beginning in 1973, Amtrak and the state discussed restoring service over the Grand Trunk Western Railway within the state, although the new route would join Amtrak's other Michigan trains on the Penn Central west of Battle Creek, Michigan, eschewing the Grand Trunk's traditional route to Chicago. New stations were built in Port Huron and East Lansing, and the state spent $1 million on track rehabilitation (equivalent to $ in  adjusted for inflation). Service began September 13, 1974, between Chicago and Port Huron, with the intention of eventually restoring the Port Huron–Toronto leg.

Amtrak renamed the train the Blue Water Limited on October 26, 1975, and re-equipped it with French-built Turboliner trainsets on May 20, 1976. The new Turboliners were capable of, but never reached,  and ran with fixed five-car consists with an overall capacity of 292 passengers. The Turboliners were withdrawn on October 25, 1981, replaced by conventional locomotives pulling Amfleet coaches.

The long-discussed extension to Toronto finally occurred on October 31, 1982. The extended service received the name International Limited , the name of an old Canadian National/Grand Trunk Chicago–Port Huron–Montreal train (1900–1907, 1919–1971). Amtrak and Via Rail, the independent Canadian Crown corporation rail company, jointly operated the International Limited (later just International) until April 25, 2004, when cross-border service was discontinued. Massive border delays post-September 11 led to falling ridership; Amtrak and Michigan agreed to truncate service at Port Huron and bring back the old Blue Water. On the Canadian side service ends at Sarnia as part of the Via Rail's Corridor route.

With a more favorable intrastate schedule and fewer delays, the Blue Water ridership showed immediate improvements, carrying 94,378 passengers in fiscal year 2004 (compared to 80,890 in FY 2003). Blue Water ridership in FY 2011 totaled 187,065, an increase of 18.0 percent from FY 2010's total of 157,709, and the highest total ever recorded by the train.  During FY 2011, the train had a total revenue of $5.8 million, a 22.3 percent increase from FY 2010's total of $4.7 million.

The Detroit–Chicago corridor has been designated by the Federal Railroad Administration as a high-speed rail corridor. A  stretch along the route of  Blue Water from Porter, Indiana to Kalamazoo, Michigan is the longest segment of track owned by Amtrak outside of the Northeast Corridor. Amtrak began speed increases along this stretch in January 2002.

Route details
The Blue Water operates over Norfolk Southern Railway, Amtrak, and Grand Trunk Western Railroad trackage:
NS Chicago Line, Chicago to Porter, Indiana
Amtrak Chicago–Detroit Line, Porter, Indiana, to Kalamazoo, Michigan
MDOT Michigan Line, Kalamazoo, Michigan, to Battle Creek, Michigan
CN/GTW Flint Subdivision, Battle Creek, Michigan, to Port Huron, Michigan

Station stops

Consist
A typical Amtrak Blue Water consists of:
2 GE Genesis P40DC/P42DC  or Siemens Charger SC44 locomotives
Five or Six Horizon Fleet or Amfleet I coaches
One or Two Horizon Fleet or Amfleet I cafe/business cars

References

Notes

External links

Michigan Association of Railroad Passengers
1978 Blue Water Limited Route Guide

Amtrak routes
Central Michigan
West Michigan
Passenger rail transportation in Illinois
Passenger rail transportation in Indiana
Passenger rail transportation in Michigan
Transportation in Lansing, Michigan
East Lansing, Michigan
Port Huron, Michigan
Higher-speed rail
Railway services introduced in 1974